Speed skating at the 1999 Winter Asian Games took place in the city of Chuncheon, Gangwon, South Korea with nine events contested — five for men and four for women.

Schedule

Medalists

Men

Women

Medal table

Participating nations
A total of 51 athletes from 5 nations competed in speed skating at the 1999 Asian Winter Games:

References
Results

External links
Official website

 
1999 Asian Winter Games events
1999
Asian Winter Games
Asian Winter Games